The Philadelphia Phillies' 1981 season was a season in American baseball.

Offseason 
 November 25, 1980: Rick Schu was signed as an amateur free agent by the Phillies.
 December 8, 1980: George Bell was drafted from the Phillies by the Toronto Blue Jays in the 1980 rule 5 draft.
 December 22, 1980: Del Unser was signed as a free agent by the Phillies.
 March 1, 1981: Randy Lerch was traded by the Phillies to the Milwaukee Brewers for Dick Davis.
 March 25, 1981: Bob Walk was traded by the Phillies to the Atlanta Braves for Gary Matthews.

Regular season 
 April 29, 1981: Phillies pitcher Steve Carlton struck out Tim Wallach of the Montreal Expos for the 3000th strikeout of his career.
 August 10, 1981: First baseman Pete Rose records his 3,631st hit of his career, passing Stan Musial to become the all-time hit leader in the National League.

Season standings

Record vs. opponents

Notable transactions 
 June 8, 1981: Vince Coleman was drafted by the Phillies in the 20th round of the 1981 Major League Baseball draft, but did not sign.
 July 12, 1981: Mike LaValliere was signed by the Phillies as an amateur free agent.

1981 Game Log

|- style="background:#fbb"
| 1 || April 8 || @ Reds || 2–3 || Tom Hume (1–0) || Sparky Lyle (0–1) || None || 51,716 || 0–1
|- style="background:#bfb"
| 2 || April 11 || @ Cardinals || 5–2 || Dick Ruthven (1–0) || Bob Forsch (0–1) || None || 38,473 || 1–1
|- style="background:#fbb"
| 3 || April 12 || @ Cardinals || 3–7 || Lary Sorensen (1–0) || Larry Christenson (0–1) || Bruce Sutter (1) || 21,462 || 1–2
|- style="background:#bfb"
| 4 || April 13 || Pirates || 5–1 || Steve Carlton (1–0) || John Candelaria (0–1) || None || 60,404 || 2–2
|- style="background:#bfb"
| 5 || April 15 || Pirates || 4–3 (11) || Tug McGraw (1–0) || Enrique Romo (0–1) || None || 27,450 || 3–2
|- style="background:#bfb"
| 6 || April 16 || Pirates || 5–3 || Dick Ruthven (2–0) || Don Robinson (0–1) || Tug McGraw (1) || 26,780 || 4–2
|- style="background:#bfb"
| 7 || April 17 || Cubs || 6–2 || Larry Christenson (1–1) || Ken Kravec (0–1) || None || 21,948 || 5–2
|- style="background:#bfb"
| 8 || April 18 || Cubs || 4–3 (10) || Steve Carlton (2–0) || Lee Smith (0–1) || None || 27,780 || 6–2
|- style="background:#bfb"
| 9 || April 19 || Cubs || 7–3 || Nino Espinosa (1–0) || Rick Reuschel (0–2) || None || 30,204 || 7–2
|- style="background:#fbb"
| 10 || April 20 || @ Expos || 8–9 || Steve Rogers (1–0) || Tug McGraw (1–1) || Woodie Fryman (2) || 24,817 || 7–3
|- style="background:#fbb"
| 11 || April 21 || @ Expos || 3–10 || Scott Sanderson (2–0) || Dick Ruthven (2–1) || None || 10,887 || 7–4
|- style="background:#fbb"
| 12 || April 22 || @ Expos || 3–4 (11) || Elías Sosa (1–0) || Tug McGraw (1–2) || None || 14,176 || 7–5
|- style="background:#bfb"
| 13 || April 24 || @ Cubs || 6–4 || Steve Carlton (3–0) || Rick Reuschel (0–3) || Ron Reed (1) || 6,274 || 8–5
|- style="background:#bfb"
| 14 || April 25 || @ Cubs || 7–5 || Sparky Lyle (1–1) || Dick Tidrow (1–2) || None || 10,990 || 9–5
|- style="background:#bfb"
| 15 || April 26 || @ Cubs || 6–2 || Marty Bystrom (1–0) || Bill Caudill (0–1) || None || 10,093 || 10–5
|- style="background:#bfb"
| 16 || April 27 || Expos || 3–1 || Dick Ruthven (3–1) || Bill Gullickson (1–1) || None || 27,347 || 11–5
|- style="background:#fbb"
| 17 || April 28 || Expos || 3–6 || Steve Ratzer (1–0) || Larry Christenson (1–2) || Elías Sosa (1) || 26,192 || 11–6
|- style="background:#bfb"
| 18 || April 29 || Expos || 6–2 || Steve Carlton (4–0) || Steve Rogers (2–1) || None || 30,142 || 12–6
|-

|- style="background:#bbb"
| – || May 1 || Giants || colspan=6 | Postponed (rain); Makeup: May 2 as a traditional double-header
|- style="background:#fbb"
| 19 || May 2 (1) || Giants || 2–6 || Doyle Alexander (4–1) || Nino Espinosa (1–1) || Greg Minton (4) || see 2nd game || 12–7
|- style="background:#bfb"
| 20 || May 2 (2) || Giants || 3–1 || Marty Bystrom (2–0) || Ed Whitson (0–3) || None || 27,376 || 13–7
|- style="background:#bfb"
| 21 || May 3 || Giants || 7–5 || Dick Ruthven (4–1) || Gary Lavelle (0–2) || Tug McGraw (2) || 41,283 || 14–7
|- style="background:#bfb"
| 22 || May 4 || Giants || 6–4 || Steve Carlton (5–0) || Allen Ripley (1–3) || None || 25,492 || 15–7
|- style="background:#bfb"
| 23 || May 5 || Dodgers || 8–7 || Sparky Lyle (2–1) || Bobby Castillo (0–3) || None || 27,241 || 16–7
|- style="background:#fbb"
| 24 || May 6 || Dodgers || 1–2 || Burt Hooton (4–0) || Nino Espinosa (1–2) || None || 25,850 || 16–8
|- style="background:#fbb"
| 25 || May 7 || Dodgers || 1–2 || Jerry Reuss (3–1) || Marty Bystrom (2–1) || None || 29,259 || 16–9
|- style="background:#bfb"
| 26 || May 8 || Padres || 11–7 || Sparky Lyle (3–1) || Gary Lucas (2–3) || None || 30,830 || 17–9
|- style="background:#bfb"
| 27 || May 9 || Padres || 9–6 || Steve Carlton (6–0) || Tim Lollar (1–3) || None || 30,907 || 18–9
|- style="background:#fbb"
| 28 || May 10 || Padres || 4–8 || Steve Mura (1–4) || Larry Christenson (1–3) || Gary Lucas (5) || 40,447 || 18–10
|- style="background:#fbb"
| 29 || May 12 || @ Giants || 0–4 || Doyle Alexander (5–2) || Nino Espinosa (1–3) || None || 10,307 || 18–11
|- style="background:#fbb"
| 30 || May 13 || @ Giants || 2–5 || Allen Ripley (3–3) || Marty Bystrom (2–2) || Greg Minton (6) || 6,946 || 18–12
|- style="background:#bfb"
| 31 || May 14 || @ Giants || 3–1 || Dick Ruthven (5–1) || Vida Blue (3–3) || Tug McGraw (3) || 6,561 || 19–12
|- style="background:#bfb"
| 32 || May 15 || @ Padres || 2–1 || Steve Carlton (7–0) || Steve Mura (1–5) || None || 15,939 || 20–12
|- style="background:#fbb"
| 33 || May 16 || @ Padres || 1–2 || John Littlefield (1–2) || Tug McGraw (1–3) || None || 40,656 || 20–13
|- style="background:#bfb"
| 34 || May 17 || @ Padres || 6–3 || Nino Espinosa (2–3) || Juan Eichelberger (3–2) || None || 18,330 || 21–13
|- style="background:#bfb"
| 35 || May 18 || @ Dodgers || 4–0 || Marty Bystrom (3–2) || Fernando Valenzuela (8–1) || None || 52,439 || 22–13
|- style="background:#bfb"
| 36 || May 19 || @ Dodgers || 3–2 || Dick Ruthven (6–1) || Bob Welch (2–2) || None || 43,812 || 23–13
|- style="background:#fbb"
| 37 || May 20 || @ Dodgers || 2–3 (10) || Steve Howe (4–1) || Tug McGraw (1–4) || None || 50,917 || 23–14
|- style="background:#fbb"
| 38 || May 22 || @ Pirates || 1–3 || Pascual Pérez (1–0) || Larry Christenson (1–4) || None || 20,695 || 23–15
|- style="background:#bfb"
| 39 || May 23 || @ Pirates || 6–4 || Mike Proly (1–0) || Kent Tekulve (0–3) || Ron Reed (2) || 20,340 || 24–15
|- style="background:#fbb"
| 40 || May 24 || @ Pirates || 1–7 || Jim Bibby (3–2) || Marty Bystrom (3–3) || Víctor Cruz (1) || 21,771 || 24–16
|- style="background:#fbb"
| 41 || May 25 || @ Mets || 3–13 || Greg A. Harris (1–0) || Dick Ruthven (6–2) || Jeff Reardon (2) || 20,469 || 24–17
|- style="background:#bfb"
| 42 || May 26 || @ Mets || 7–5 || Ron Reed (1–0) || Neil Allen (3–2) || Tug McGraw (4) || 13,973 || 25–17
|- style="background:#fbb"
| 43 || May 27 || @ Mets || 1–3 || Pat Zachry (5–5) || Larry Christenson (1–5) || None || 10,930 || 25–18
|- style="background:#fbb"
| 44 || May 29 || Cardinals || 4–11 || Bob Forsch (5–2) || Nino Espinosa (2–4) || Mark Littell (1) || 32,358 || 25–19
|- style="background:#bfb"
| 45 || May 30 || Cardinals || 10–2 || Dick Ruthven (7–2) || Lary Sorensen (4–4) || None || 35,034 || 26–19
|- style="background:#bfb"
| 46 || May 31 || Cardinals || 6–1 || Steve Carlton (8–0) || Silvio Martínez (1–4) || None || 54,103 || 27–19
|-

|- style="background:#bfb"
| 47 || June 1 || Mets || 5–4 || Sparky Lyle (4–1) || Neil Allen (3–3) || Tug McGraw (5) || 27,631 || 28–19
|- style="background:#bfb"
| 48 || June 2 || Mets || 9–7 || Mike Proly (2–0) || Ed Lynch (1–3) || Ron Reed (3) || 25,375 || 29–19
|- style="background:#fbb"
| 49 || June 3 || Mets || 2–6 || Greg A. Harris (2–1) || Dick Ruthven (7–3) || Neil Allen (5) || 27,588 || 29–20
|- style="background:#fbb"
| 50 || June 5 || @ Braves || 1–4 || Rick Mahler (3–1) || Steve Carlton (8–1) || Rick Camp (8) || 17,059 || 29–21
|- style="background:#bfb"
| 51 || June 6 || @ Braves || 3–0 || Larry Christenson (2–5) || Tommy Boggs (1–9) || Mike Proly (1) || 15,291 || 30–21
|- style="background:#bfb"
| 52 || June 7 || @ Braves || 7–5 || Sparky Lyle (5–1) || Gaylord Perry (5–4) || Ron Reed (4) || 23,482 || 31–21
|- style="background:#bfb"
| 53 || June 8 || Astros || 4–3 || Dick Ruthven (8–3) || Don Sutton (4–6) || Tug McGraw (6) || 31,664 || 32–21
|- style="background:#bfb"
| 54 || June 9 || Astros || 10–3 || Marty Bystrom (4–3) || Joe Niekro (6–5) || Ron Reed (5) || 33,978 || 33–21
|- style="background:#bfb"
| 55 || June 10 || Astros || 5–4 || Steve Carlton (9–1) || Frank LaCorte (3–2) || Tug McGraw (7) || 57,386 || 34–21
|- style="background:#bbb"
| – || June 12 || Braves || colspan=6 | Game cancelled: players' strike
|- style="background:#bbb"
| – || June 13 || Braves || colspan=6 | Game cancelled: players' strike
|- style="background:#bbb"
| – || June 14 || Braves || colspan=6 | Game cancelled: players' strike
|- style="background:#bbb"
| – || June 15 || Reds || colspan=6 | Game cancelled: players' strike
|- style="background:#bbb"
| – || June 16 || Reds || colspan=6 | Game cancelled: players' strike
|- style="background:#bbb"
| – || June 17 || @ Astros || colspan=6 | Game cancelled: players' strike
|- style="background:#bbb"
| – || June 18 || @ Astros || colspan=6 | Game cancelled: players' strike
|- style="background:#bbb"
| – || June 19 || @ Reds || colspan=6 | Game cancelled: players' strike
|- style="background:#bbb"
| – || June 20 || @ Reds || colspan=6 | Game cancelled: players' strike
|- style="background:#bbb"
| – || June 21 || @ Reds || colspan=6 | Game cancelled: players' strike
|- style="background:#bbb"
| – || June 23 || @ Cubs || colspan=6 | Game cancelled: players' strike
|- style="background:#bbb"
| – || June 24 || @ Cubs || colspan=6 | Game cancelled: players' strike
|- style="background:#bbb"
| – || June 25 || @ Cubs || colspan=6 | Game cancelled: players' strike
|- style="background:#bbb"
| – || June 26 || Pirates || colspan=6 | Game cancelled: players' strike
|- style="background:#bbb"
| – || June 27 || Pirates || colspan=6 | Game cancelled: players' strike
|- style="background:#bbb"
| – || June 28 || Pirates || colspan=6 | Game cancelled: players' strike
|- style="background:#bbb"
| – || June 29 || @ Cardinals || colspan=6 | Game cancelled: players' strike
|- style="background:#bbb"
| – || June 30 (1) || @ Cardinals || colspan=6 | Game cancelled: players' strike
|- style="background:#bbb"
| – || June 30 (2) || @ Cardinals || colspan=6 | Game cancelled: players' strike
|-

|- style="background:#bbb"
| – || July 1 || @ Cardinals || colspan=6 | Game cancelled: players' strike
|- style="background:#bbb"
| – || July 2 || @ Cardinals || colspan=6 | Game cancelled: players' strike
|- style="background:#bbb"
| – || July 3 || Expos || colspan=6 | Game cancelled: players' strike
|- style="background:#bbb"
| – || July 4 || Expos || colspan=6 | Game cancelled: players' strike
|- style="background:#bbb"
| – || July 5 || Expos || colspan=6 | Game cancelled: players' strike
|- style="background:#bbb"
| – || July 7 || @ Pirates || colspan=6 | Game cancelled: players' strike
|- style="background:#bbb"
| – || July 8 || @ Pirates || colspan=6 | Game cancelled: players' strike
|- style="background:#bbb"
| – || July 9 || @ Pirates || colspan=6 | Game cancelled: players' strike
|- style="background:#bbb"
| – || July 10 || Mets || colspan=6 | Game cancelled: players' strike
|- style="background:#bbb"
| – || July 11 (1) || Mets || colspan=6 | Game cancelled: players' strike
|- style="background:#bbb"
| – || July 11 (2) || Mets || colspan=6 | Game cancelled: players' strike
|- style="background:#bbb"
| – || July 12 || Mets || colspan=6 | Game cancelled: players' strike
|- style="background:#bbb"
| – || July 14 || colspan=7 | 1981 Major League Baseball All-Star Game at Cleveland Stadium in Cleveland Cancelled (players' strike), then postponed to August 9|- style="background:#bbb"
| – || July 16 || Giants || colspan=6 | Game cancelled: players' strike|- style="background:#bbb"
| – || July 17 || Giants || colspan=6 | Game cancelled: players' strike|- style="background:#bbb"
| – || July 18 || Dodgers || colspan=6 | Game cancelled: players' strike|- style="background:#bbb"
| – || July 19 || Dodgers || colspan=6 | Game cancelled: players' strike|- style="background:#bbb"
| – || July 20 || Dodgers || colspan=6 | Game cancelled: players' strike|- style="background:#bbb"
| – || July 21 || Padres || colspan=6 | Game cancelled: players' strike|- style="background:#bbb"
| – || July 22 || Padres || colspan=6 | Game cancelled: players' strike|- style="background:#bbb"
| – || July 23 || Padres || colspan=6 | Game cancelled: players' strike|- style="background:#bbb"
| – || July 24 || @ Giants || colspan=6 | Game cancelled: players' strike|- style="background:#bbb"
| – || July 25 || @ Giants || colspan=6 | Game cancelled: players' strike|- style="background:#bbb"
| – || July 26 || @ Giants || colspan=6 | Game cancelled: players' strike|- style="background:#bbb"
| – || July 27 || @ Padres || colspan=6 | Game cancelled: players' strike|- style="background:#bbb"
| – || July 28 || @ Padres || colspan=6 | Game cancelled: players' strike|- style="background:#bbb"
| – || July 29 || @ Padres || colspan=6 | Game cancelled: players' strike|- style="background:#bbb"
| – || July 31 || @ Dodgers || colspan=6 | Game cancelled: players' strike|-

|- style="background:#bbb"
| – || August 1 || @ Dodgers || colspan=6 | Game cancelled: players' strike|- style="background:#bbb"
| – || August 2 || @ Dodgers || colspan=6 | Game cancelled: players' strike|- style="background:#bbb"
| – || August 4 || Cubs || colspan=6 | Game cancelled: players' strike|- style="background:#bbb"
| – || August 5 || Cubs || colspan=6 | Game cancelled: players' strike|- style="background:#bbb"
| – || August 6 || Cubs || colspan=6 | Game cancelled: players' strike|- style="background:#bbb"
| – || August 7 || @ Expos || colspan=6 | Game cancelled: players' strike|- style="background:#bbb"
| – || August 8 || @ Expos || colspan=6 | Game cancelled: players' strike|- style="background:#bbb"
| – || August 9 (1) || @ Expos || colspan=6 | Game cancelled: players' strike|- style="background:#bbb"
| – || August 9 (2) || @ Expos || colspan=6 | Game cancelled: players' strike|- style="background:#bbcaff;"
| – || August 9 ||colspan="7" | 1981 Major League Baseball All-Star Game at Cleveland Stadium in Cleveland
|- style="background:#fbb"
| 56 || August 10 || Cardinals || 3–7 || Bob Forsch (7–2) || Larry Christenson (2–6) || Bruce Sutter (12) || 60,561 || 0–1(34–22)
|- style="background:#bfb"
| 57 || August 11 || Cardinals || 6–5 (10) || Ron Reed (2–0) || Jim Kaat (3–2) || None || 24,549 || 1–1(35–22)
|- style="background:#fbb"
| 58 || August 12 || Cardinals || 3–11 || Bob Sykes (1–0) || Dick Ruthven (8–4) || Mark Littell (2) || 23,566 || 1–2(35–23)
|- style="background:#fbb"
| 59 || August 13 || Cardinals || 2–5 || John Martin (4–1) || Steve Carlton (9–2) || Bruce Sutter (13) || 26,783 || 1–3(35–24)
|- style="background:#bfb"
| 60 || August 14 || @ Mets || 8–4 || Larry Christenson (3–6) || Mike Scott (3–5) || Mike Proly (2) || 34,136 || 2–3(36–24)
|- style="background:#fbb"
| 61 || August 15 || @ Mets || 1–3 || Pete Falcone (2–3) || Nino Espinosa (2–5) || Neil Allen (8) || 14,309 || 2–4(36–25)
|- style="background:#fbb"
| 62 || August 16 || @ Mets || 2–5 || Pat Zachry (6–7) || Dick Ruthven (8–5) || Neil Allen (9) || 21,635 || 2–5(36–26)
|- style="background:#fbb"
| 63 || August 18 || @ Reds || 1–3 || Tom Seaver (8–2) || Steve Carlton (9–3) || Tom Hume (8) || 25,363 || 2–6(36–27)
|- style="background:#fbb"
| 64 || August 19 || @ Reds || 3–6 || Tom Hume (6–2) || Sparky Lyle (5–2) || None || 23,133 || 2–7(36–28)
|- style="background:#bfb"
| 65 || August 21 || Astros || 5–4 || Sparky Lyle (6–2) || Vern Ruhle (1–3) || Tug McGraw (8) || 31,693 || 3–7(37–28)
|- style="background:#bfb"
| 66 || August 22 || Astros || 8–4 || Dick Ruthven (9–5) || Joe Niekro (7–7) || None || 35,199 || 4–7(38–28)
|- style="background:#bfb"
| 67 || August 23 || Astros || 6–0 || Steve Carlton (10–3) || Bob Knepper (6–3) || None || 30,630 || 5–7(39–28)
|- style="background:#bfb"
| 68 || August 24 || Braves || 7–5 (13) || Tug McGraw (2–4) || Al Hrabosky (0–1) || None || 23,383 || 6–7(40–28)
|- style="background:#fbb"
| 69 || August 25 || Braves || 2–12 || Phil Niekro (6–4) || Mark Davis (0–1) || None || 33,383 || 6–8(40–29)
|- style="background:#fbb"
| 70 || August 26 || Braves || 3–5 (10) || Rick Camp (7–1) || Ron Reed (2–1) || None || 28,283 || 6–9(40–30)
|- style="background:#fbb"
| 71 || August 28 || @ Astros || 2–3 (10) || Dave Smith (2–3) || Sparky Lyle (6–3) || None || 29,482 || 6–10(40–31)
|- style="background:#fbb"
| 72 || August 29 (1) || @ Astros || 1–6 || Vern Ruhle (2–3) || Mark Davis (0–2) || None || see 2nd game || 6–11(40–32)
|- style="background:#fbb"
| 73 || August 29 (2) || @ Astros || 1–2 || Billy Smith (1–0) || Dickie Noles (0–1) || Frank LaCorte (4) || 33,327 || 6–12(40–33)
|- style="background:#fbb"
| 74 || August 30 || @ Astros || 4–5 (10) || Dave Smith (3–3) || Sparky Lyle (6–4) || None || 23,102 || 6–13(40–34)
|- style="background:#bfb"
| 75 || August 31 || @ Braves || 11–8 || Dick Ruthven (10–5) || Gaylord Perry (6–5) || Ron Reed (6) || 8,207 || 7–13(41–34)
|-

|- style="background:#bfb"
| 76 || September 1 || @ Braves || 3–0 || Steve Carlton (11–3) || Rick Mahler (4–5) || None || 3,374 || 8–13(42–34)
|- style="background:#fbb"
| 77 || September 2 || @ Braves || 2–3 || Gene Garber (4–3) || Warren Brusstar (0–1) || None || 6,232 || 8–14(42–35)
|- style="background:#fbb"
| 78 || September 3 || Reds || 3–9 || Bruce Berenyi (7–4) || Mark Davis (0–3) || None || 26,540 || 8–15(42–36)
|- style="background:#bfb"
| 79 || September 4 || Reds || 7–6 || Sparky Lyle (7–4) || Doug Bair (2–2) || Tug McGraw (9) || 25,020 || 9–15(43–36)
|- style="background:#bfb"
| 80 || September 5 || Reds || 5–4 || Ron Reed (3–1) || Mario Soto (8–8) || None || 41,845 || 10–15(44–36)
|- style="background:#fbb"
| 81 || September 6 || Reds || 4–5 || Tom Hume (7–3) || Sparky Lyle (7–5) || Joe Price (2) || 30,366 || 10–16(44–37)
|- style="background:#fbb"
| 82 || September 7 || Expos || 4–5 || Woodie Fryman (5–2) || Mike Proly (2–1) || Jeff Reardon (5) || 31,401 || 10–17(44–38)
|- style="background:#bfb"
| 83 || September 8 || Expos || 10–5 || Dan Larson (1–0) || Scott Sanderson (7–6) || None || 11,812 || 11–17(45–38)
|- style="background:#bfb"
| 84 || September 9 || Expos || 11–8 || Ron Reed (4–1) || Woodie Fryman (5–3) || Sparky Lyle (1) || 25,468 || 12–17(46–38)
|- style="background:#bfb"
| 85 || September 11 || @ Pirates || 8–0 || Steve Carlton (12–3) || Rick Rhoden (8–3) || None || 12,799 || 13–17(47–38)
|- style="background:#fbb"
| 86 || September 12 || @ Pirates || 2–6 || Eddie Solomon (7–4) || Dickie Noles (0–2) || Rod Scurry (5) || 11,370 || 13–18(47–39)
|- style="background:#fbb"
| 87 || September 13 || @ Pirates || 2–3 || Odell Jones (4–2) || Ron Reed (4–2) || Kent Tekulve || 16,493 || 13–19(47–40)
|- style="background:#bbb"
| – || September 15 || @ Mets || colspan=6 | Postponed (rain); Makeup: September 16 as a traditional double-header
|- style="background:#bfb"
| 88 || September 16 (1) || @ Mets || 3–1 || Dick Ruthven (11–5) || Pat Zachry (7–12) || None || see 2nd game || 14–19(48–40)
|- style="background:#fbb"
| 89 || September 16 (2) || @ Mets || 4–5 || Mike Marshall (3–2) || Steve Carlton (12–4) || Neil Allen (17) || 4,353 || 14–20(48–41)
|- style="background:#bfb"
| 90 || September 17 || @ Mets || 3–2 || Dickie Noles (1–2) || Mike Scott (4–9) || Ron Reed (7) || 5,501 || 15–20(49–41)
|- style="background:#fbb"
| 91 || September 18 || Pirates || 6–7 || Rod Scurry (4–5) || Ron Reed (4–3) || Mark Lee (2) || 24,537 || 15–21(49–42)
|- style="background:#bfb"
| 92 || September 19 || Pirates || 8–2 || Dan Larson (2–0) || Odell Jones (4–3) || Larry Christenson (1) || 30,446 || 16–21(50–42)
|- style="background:#bfb"
| 93 || September 20 || Pirates || 5–4 || Sparky Lyle (8–5) || Eddie Solomon (7–5) || None || 31,489 || 17–21(51–42)
|- style="background:#fbb"
| 94 || September 21 || @ Expos || 0–1 (17) || Bryn Smith (1–0) || Jerry Reed (0–1) || None || 24,161 || 17–22(51–43)
|- style="background:#fbb"
| 95 || September 22 || @ Expos || 2–6 || Steve Rogers (11–7) || Dick Ruthven (11–6) || None || 21,797 || 17–23(51–44)
|- style="background:#bfb"
| 96 || September 23 || @ Cardinals || 9–4 || Dickie Noles (2–2) || John Martin (6–5) || Sparky Lyle (2) || 16,845 || 18–23(52–44)
|- style="background:#bfb"
| 97 || September 24 || @ Cardinals || 14–6 || Mark Davis (1–3) || Lary Sorensen (7–7) || None || 11,758 || 19–23(53–44)
|- style="background:#bfb"
| 98 || September 25 || @ Cubs || 9–2 || Dan Larson (3–0) || Ken Kravec (1–6) || None || 4,482 || 20–23(54–44)
|- style="background:#bbb"
| – || September 26 || @ Cubs || colspan=6 | Postponed (rain); Makeup: September 27 as a traditional double-header
|- style="background:#bfb"
| 99 || September 27 (1) || @ Cubs || 5–2 || Steve Carlton (13–4) || Doug Bird (9–6) || None || see 2nd game || 21–23(55–44)
|- style="background:#fbb"
| 100 || September 27 (2) || @ Cubs || 0–14 || Mike Krukow (9–9) || Dick Ruthven (11–7) || None || 18,783 || 21–24(55–45)
|- style="background:#bfb"
| 101 || September 28 || Mets || 12–4 || Larry Christenson (4–6) || Ed Lynch (4–5) || None || 20,403 || 22–24(56–45)
|- style="background:#fbb"
| 102 || September 29 || Mets || 0–7 || Pete Falcone (4–3) || Mark Davis (1–4) || None || 20,110 || 22–25(56–46)
|- style="background:#bfb"
| 103 || September 30 || Cardinals || 8–5 || Sparky Lyle (9–5) || Luis DeLeón (0–1) || Ron Reed (8) || 21,382 || 23–25(57–46)
|-

|- style="background:#fbb"
| 104 || October 1 || Cardinals || 2–3 (10) || Doug Bair (4–2) || Larry Christenson (4–7) || None || 20,482 || 23–26(57–47)
|- style="background:#bfb"
| 105 || October 2 || Cubs || 9–7 || Ron Reed (5–3) || Dick Tidrow (3–10) || None || 20,453 || 24–26(58–47)
|- style="background:#fbb"
| 106 || October 3 || Cubs || 4–8 || Jay Howell (2–0) || Sparky Lyle (9–6) || Randy Martz (6) || 35,169 || 24–27(58–48)
|- style="background:#bfb"
| 107 || October 4 || Cubs || 2–1 || Dick Ruthven (12–7) || Lee Smith (3–6) || Tug McGraw (10) || 21,912 || 25–27(59–48)
|-

 Roster 

 Player stats 

 Batting 

 Starters by position 
Note: Pos = Position; G = Games played; AB = At bats; H = Hits; Avg. = Batting average; HR = Home runs; RBI = Runs batted in

 Other batters 
Note: G = Games played; AB = At bats; H = Hits; Avg. = Batting average; HR = Home runs; RBI = Runs batted in

 Pitching 

 Starting pitchers 
Note: G = Games pitched; IP = Innings pitched; W = Wins; L = Losses; ERA = Earned run average; SO = Strikeouts

 Other pitchers 
Note: G = Games pitched; IP = Innings pitched; W = Wins; L = Losses; ERA = Earned run average; SO = Strikeouts

 Relief pitchers 
Note: G = Games pitched; W = Wins; L = Losses; SV = Saves; ERA = Earned run average; SO = Strikeouts

 1981 National League Division Series 

 Montreal Expos vs. Philadelphia Phillies 
Montreal wins series, 3–2.

1981 Postseason Game Log

|- style="background:#fbb"
| 1 || October 7 || @ Expos || 1–3 || Steve Rogers (1–0) || Steve Carlton (0–1) || Jeff Reardon (1) || 34,237 || 0–1
|- style="background:#fbb"
| 2 || October 8 || @ Expos || 1–3 || Bill Gullickson (1–0) || Dick Ruthven (0–1) || Jeff Reardon (2) || 45,896 || 0–2
|- style="background:#bfb"
| 3 || October 9 || Expos || 6–2 || Larry Christenson (1–0) || Ray Burris (0–1) || None || 36,835 || 1–2
|- style="background:#bfb"
| 4 || October 10 || Expos || 6–5 (10) || Tug McGraw (1–0) || Jeff Reardon (0–1) || None || 38,818 || 2–2
|- style="background:#fbb"
| 5 || October 11 || Expos || 0–3 || Steve Rogers (2–0) || Steve Carlton''' (0–2) || None || 47,384 || 2–3
|-

 Farm system 

 Notes 

 References 
1981 Philadelphia Phillies season at Baseball Reference''

Philadelphia Phillies seasons
Philadelphia Phillies season
Philadelphia